Third Lake (Nova Scotia) could refer to one of many lakes:

Annapolis County
 Third Lake  located at

Cape Breton Regional Municipality
 Third Lake  located at

Digby County

 Third Lake  located at 
 Third Lake  located at

Guysborough County

 Third Lake located at 
 Third Lake located at 
 Third Lake located at 
 Third Lake located at

Halifax Regional Municipality

 Third Lake  located at 
 Third Lake located at 
 Third Lake  located at 
 Third Lake located at 
 Third Lake  located at

Richmond County

 Third Lake  located at

Shelburne County

 Third Lake  located at

Victoria County

 Third Lake O'Law   located at

Yarmouth County

 Third Lake  located at

References
Geographical Names Board of Canada
Explore HRM
Nova Scotia Placenames

Geography of Nova Scotia
Lakes of Nova Scotia